İlhan Palut (born 12 November 1976) is a Turkish football manager and former player who most recently managed Süper Lig club Konyaspor. During his football career, İlhan Palut played as a midfielder. As a coach, his preferred in-field formation is 4–2–3–1. Throughout his playing career, İlhan Palut represented only four different clubs, playing a total of 338 matches and scoring 32 goals. He also has experience playing for the national team.

Ilhan Palut gained recognition in the Turkish football community for his success with Hatayspor before making his Süper Lig debut as the head coach of Göztepe.

Following the end of his active football career with Çorumspor, Ilhan Palut began his coaching career as an assistant coach at Kırıkhanspor. He most recently served as the coach of Konyaspor, one of the teams in the Süper Lig.

Managerial career

Hatayspor
After an amateur career in Turkish football mostly with Hatayspor, Palut joined Hatayspor as the sporting director at the beginning of the 2016–17 season but later took on the role of coach during the half-time. Under his management, Hatayspor won the championship in the Second League at the end of the 2017–18 season and was promoted to the First League.

Although Hatayspor only earned four points in the first five weeks of the 2018–19 season in the First League, the team improved and made its way to the Süper Lig, finishing the season in third place and qualifying for the play-off matches. After eliminating Adana Demirspor in the play-off semi-finals, Hatayspor lost to Gaziantep on penalties in the final match, missing the chance to advance to the Süper Lig. In the same season, Hatayspor reached the quarter-finals of the Turkish Cup but was eliminated despite winning 4–2 after a 2–0 defeat in a first game against Galatasaray.

In the 2019–20 season, Hatayspor started the league with three wins in the first six weeks but was eliminated by Siirt İl Özel İdaresi in the 3rd Round of the Turkish Cup. On 1 October 2019, Due to the team's performance, Hatayspor and Palut parted ways.

Göztepe
On 5 November 2019, following a series of defeats, Tamer Tuna resigned as coach of Göztepe, and the management reached a three-year agreement with İlhan Palut to take over. On 11 January 2021, despite not achieving poor results, Palut resigned from his post by mutual agreement with the Göztepe management.

Konyaspor

on 10 February 2021 after İsmail Kartal's resignation following Beşiktaş's defeat, the management of Konyaspor signed a 1.5-year contract with coach İlhan Palut. Palut had a challenging start with Konyaspor in his first season, as the team was in a critical position in the league, but they managed to finish in 11th place. In the second season, he drew a successful strategy, and his team played impressive football, earning 68 points and finishing in the third place, which broke the club's record for the highest points collected in the Süper Lig during the 2021–22 season. Palut believes that despite their current position, they have made an acceptable start this season and his primary goal is to create a stable team identity for Konyaspor.

During his tenure, Palut led the team to 36 wins, 25 draws, and 20 losses in 81 games. He had the highest score average of 1.64 points among coaches who had managed Konyaspor for 15 or more games in the history of the Süper Lig. However, on 16 January 2023, Konyaspor, a football club, announced that they were terminating their contract with their coach, İlhan Palut. At the time of the announcement, Konyaspor had played a total of 18 matches in the league, winning 6, drawing 9, and losing 3. They were in 7th place in the league standings. 

Ilhan Palut, who spoke after parting ways with Konyaspor, mentioned that he was informed about the decision to terminate his contract the previous day at noon. According to him, the club thanked him and said that a change in leadership would be beneficial for the team. Palut expressed that he and his team were surprised by the sudden decision, but they all agreed that it was for the best of the club. He also stated that he will make an official statement after receiving the termination certificate. On the same day, Konyaspor announced that they had appointed Serbian coach Aleksandar Stanojević as the new head of the team to replace İlhan Palut.

Managerial Statistics

Honours

Manager 
Hatayspor

 TFF Second League: 2017–18

Konyaspor

 Süper Lig Third: 2021–22

References

External links
 
 TFF Manager Profile
 

1967 births
Living people
People from Reyhanlı
Turkish footballers
Turkish football managers
Hatayspor footballers
Adana Demirspor footballers
TFF First League players
TFF Second League players
Hatayspor managers
Göztepe S.K. managers
Süper Lig managers
Association football midfielders
Sportspeople from Hatay